Resurrection (German: Auferstehung) is a 1958  historical drama film directed by Rolf Hansen and starring Horst Buchholz, Myriam Bru and Edith Mill. It was made as a co-production between France, Italy and West Germany. It is an adaptation of the 1899 novel Resurrection by Leo Tolstoy.

It was shot at the Bavaria Studios in Munich with sets designed by the art director Robert Herlth.

Cast 
 Horst Buchholz as Nechljudoff
 Myriam Bru as Katjuschka
 Edith Mill as Fedosia
 Ruth Niehaus as Missy
 Lea Massari as Marja Pawlowna
 Marisa Merlini as Bockowa
 Günther Lüders as Briefträger
 Jean Murat as Gerichtsvorsitzender
 Robert Freitag as Simonson
 Gabrielle Dorziat as Kitajewa
  as Taras
 Antonio Cifariello as Chenbeck
 Rudolf Rhomberg as Smjelkoff
 Elisabeth Flickenschildt as Agrafena
 Ernst Schröder as Gouverneur
 Lina Carstens as Matrjona
 Alma Seidler as Tante Marja
 Adrienne Gessner as Tante Sonja
  as Kartinkin
 Ernst Fritz Fürbringer as Oberst
  as Prosecutor
 Roma Bahn as Großfürstin
 Tilla Durieux as Alte
 Hans Magel as Richter
 Marisa Merlini as Bockowa

References

Bibliography
 Bock, Hans-Michael & Bergfelder, Tim. The Concise CineGraph. Encyclopedia of German Cinema. Berghahn Books, 2009.

External links 

1958 films
West German films
Films directed by Rolf Hansen
Films based on Resurrection
Films set in the 19th century
Films set in Russia
1950s historical drama films
French historical drama films
Italian historical drama films
German historical drama films
1950s German-language films
Bavaria Film films
Films shot at Bavaria Studios
1958 drama films
1950s Italian films
1950s French films
1950s German films